The 2004–05 Druga HNL (also known as 2. HNL) season was the 14th season of Croatia's second level football since its establishment in 1992. The league was contested in two regional groups (North Division and South Division), with 12 clubs each.

North Division

Clubs

First stage

Play-off Group

Play-out Group

South Division

Clubs

First stage

Play-off Group

Play-out Group

Promotion play-off

Cibalia and Novalja, winners of the North and South Division, qualified for a two-legged promotion play-off, which took place on 24 and 28 May 2005. Cibalia won the tie 5–1 on aggregate score, thereby earning promotion to the Prva HNL for the following season.

However, Novalja had another chance for promotion, as the losing team from the promotion play-off played another two-legged tie against the 11th placed team of Prva HNL, Međimurje. Međimurje won 3–1 on aggregate.

See also
2004–05 Prva HNL
2004–05 Croatian Cup

References

External links
2004–05 in Croatian Football at Rec.Sport.Soccer Statistics Foundation
Official website  

First Football League (Croatia) seasons
Cro
Drug